Kushki Kuhna is a district of Herat province in northwestern Afghanistan. It is situated in the northern part of the province. It borders Kushk District to the west, the nation of Turkmenistan to the north, Badghis Province to the east, and Karukh District to the south. The population Kushki Kuhna is 44,400 (as of 2012), which includes the following ethnic groups: 55% Tajik, 40% Pashtun and 5% Hazara.

The headquarters or district center is also known as Kushki Kuhna. The main source of income is the agriculture. The infrastructure, health and education systems have been improved since 2002.

Agriculture 
The following table demonstrates the total amount of irrigated and rain-fed lands in the district.

References

External links 
 Map of Settlements AIMS, May 2002

See also 
Districts of Afghanistan

Districts of Herat Province